Pere de Montagut was a Catalan squire who helped, in the 1230s, King James I of Aragon to conquer some zones of the kingdom of Valencia from the Moors. As a reward, he was given some territories under the condition that he had to repopulate them with Christian settlers. L’Alcúdia was undoubtedly the most important of his possessions, and he set up his home in this town till his death.

13th-century Catalan people
Spanish soldiers